Smilno is a village and municipality in Bardejov District in the Prešov Region of north-east Slovakia.

History
In historical records, the village was first mentioned in 1250.

Geography
The municipality lies at an altitude of 425 metres and covers an area of 13.796 km². It has a population of about 720.

External links
 
 
http://smilno.marcinek.sk
https://web.archive.org/web/20080414181528/http://www.smilno.ocu.sk/
http://www.smilno.wbl.sk
http://www.statistics.sk/mosmis/eng/run.html

Villages and municipalities in Bardejov District
Šariš